Amblyrhynchotes honckenii, known as the evileye pufferfish, evileye puffer or evileye blaasop, is a species of fish on the genus Amblyrhynchotes. It was first described by Marcus Elieser Bloch in 1785.

Description 
Amblyrhynchotes honckenii has a big head that tapers to a narrow tail. The head is bluntly rounded with high set eyes and a small mouth. The eyes are deep blue or green in colour with a yellow or orange iris. The upper parts of the body range from black to dark brown to dark green in colour and is covered in pale yellow or white blotches, although juveniles tend to be paler than adults. The lower part of the body is white. Some individuals have a yellow line dividing the darker and paler parts of the body. Both parts are covered in small spikes. These are most noticeable when the fish is inflated, particularly on the stomach.

All the fins are fleshy. The pectoral fins are large and pale yellow. The pectoral and caudal fins are also pale yellow. The anal fins are usually white, but they turn yellow in breeding males.

Distribution and habitat 
It is native to the Indo-West Pacific, from South Africa to China. It is most common in areas where the sea floor is covered in fine sand, particularly in areas that are near reefs.

Ecology 
This species spends much of its time buried in sand with only the head sticking out. When startled, it will typically inflate and hang in the water before suddenly defalting and rapidly swimming away.

Toxicity 
Its flesh is poisonous to humans and other animals. It is also poisonous to humans when touched with bare skin.

Conservation 
It is classed as being of "Least Concern" on the IUCN Red List.

References 

Tetraodontidae
Fish described in 1785
Fish of South Africa
Least concern biota of Africa
Least concern biota of Asia
Fish of China